The French West African Cup or Coupe d'Afrique Occidentale Française was a football (soccer) tournament between clubs of the former French Western African territories.

This area comprised the current states of Benin (then Dahomey), Burkina Faso (then Haute-Volta), Guinea (Guinée), Ivory Coast (Côte d'Ivoire), Mali (then Soudan), Mauritania (Mauritanie), Niger and Senegal (Sénégal). The current Togo was not part of the A.O.F. but its clubs gained entrance to the tournament during the last five editions (first in 1955/56).

The Ligue d'AOF de Foot-Ball was created in March 1946 in Dakar. The only French Western African territory which refused to enter was Mauritania. The organisation was officially affiliated to the FFF (French FA) in 1951.

The Coupe d'AOF was created in 1947, when the president of the Ligue d'AOF, Mr. Barat, received a trophy from the FFF. He immediately announced a competition for the trophy, a Coupe du Sénégal, for clubs from the "4 communes du Sénégal", Dakar, Gorée, Rufisque and Saint-Louis. Sixteen clubs from these towns, all in current Senegal, entered the first round (1/8 finals) of the competition, played early April 1947. On the 17th of April, a new weekly sports magazine, "Afriqu'Sports", appeared in Dakar, referring to the competition as "Coupe d'AOF". This name was eventually taken up be the other media, and the second edition then indeed extended beyond Senegal. Shortly after the introduction of the football cup, similar tournaments were started in rugby (1951) and basketball (1952).

The first edition in 1947, restricted to Senegal, had 16 participants; the highest number of participants (302) was reached in 1958/59, while the final edition (as Coupe Interfédérale; the territories of French West Africa were gradually gaining independence at the time) still had 205 participants (the regions of Guinée and Côte d'Ivoire did not enter).

Winners

References 

French West Africa
Defunct international club association football competitions in Africa
Recurring sporting events established in 1947
1960 disestablishments
1947 establishments in French West Africa